"The Pop Singer's Fear of the Pollen Count" is a song by the Divine Comedy. Written by Neil Hannon, it was originally recorded for the Liberation album and was issued as the B-side of "Lucy".

The Best of the Divine Comedy version

The song was re-recorded for the 1999 compilation album A Secret History... The Best of the Divine Comedy. It was released as a single from that album and peaked at number 17 in the UK singles chart.

Track listing 
All tracks written by Neil Hannon; except where indicated.

CD single #1

Setanta Records / SETCDA070

CD single #2

Setanta Records / SETCDB070

Cassette single

Setanta Records / SETMC070

Critical reception
In an AllMusic album review of Liberation, critic Ned Raggett said the song was influenced by the English rock band XTC. He also noted is "slipping in as much wry humor as he does gentle pathos and reflectionplenty of all three."

References 

1999 singles
The Divine Comedy (band) songs
Songs written by Neil Hannon
Setanta Records singles
1993 songs
Songs about musicians
Songs about diseases and disorders